Nikola Aćin (born 19 December 1999) is a Serbian swimmer. He competed in the men's 4 × 100 metre freestyle relay event at the 2020 Summer Olympics together with Andrej Barna, Uroš Nikolić and Velimir Stjepanović. They finished 10th with time 3:13.71, setting the new Serbian national record.

References

External links
 
 

1999 births
Living people
Serbian male swimmers
Sportspeople from Zrenjanin
Male backstroke swimmers
Serbian male freestyle swimmers
Swimmers at the 2020 Summer Olympics
Olympic swimmers of Serbia
Purdue Boilermakers men's swimmers
Swimmers at the 2022 Mediterranean Games
Mediterranean Games competitors for Serbia
21st-century Serbian people